From March 7 to June 6, through a series of primaries and caucuses, voters of the Republican Party elected delegates to the 1916 Republican National Convention, held June 7 to June 10, 1916, in Chicago, Illinois to choose the party's nominee for President of the United States. The delegate election process was inconclusive, with a small plurality supporting Associate Justice of the Supreme Court Charles Evans Hughes. Hughes eventually secured the nomination on the third ballot.

Several more conservative or progressive candidates received a large share of elected delegates. Conservatives split between Senator John W. Weeks, Senator Elihu Root, and former Vice President Charles W. Fairbanks. Progressives rallied behind Senator Albert Cummins, who dominated the primaries, Senator Robert M. La Follette, and former President Theodore Roosevelt, who returned to the party after fatally splitting it in the 1912 election. Neither faction consolidated behind any one candidate, and the moderate Hughes, acceptable to all parties, prevailed.

Background

1912 presidential election

The 1912 presidential election was an epochal disaster for the Republican Party, which had won eleven of the previous thirteen elections, a period of dominance only interrupted by the two non-consecutive terms of Grover Cleveland and unequaled before or since in the history of the United States. Former President Theodore Roosevelt challenged William Howard Taft for the Republican nomination, dissatisfied with his successor's policies and encouraged by a groundswell of popular support. Despite this support, Roosevelt was unable to crack Taft's hold over the convention and caucus systems by which most delegates were selected and, declaring the nomination illegitimate, broke off to form the Progressive Party. With the Republicans split between Roosevelt and Taft, Democratic nominee Woodrow Wilson easily won a landslide election, albeit with a plurality of the vote.

1914 midterms

The 1914 midterm elections were a disappointment for the Republicans; the Democratic Party retained control of both chambers for the first time since the American Civil War. Republicans were partly damaged by the passage of the 17th Amendment to the United States Constitution, which required the direct popular election of United States Senators for the first time (despite opposition from many Republicans), and the continued presence of the Progressive Party.

The Democratic majority in the Senate was expanded to 56 seats, in many cases by a plurality, mirroring President Wilson's. In California, Colorado, Indiana, and Oregon, the Progressive vote more than accounted for the margin of Democratic victory.

The Progressive Party itself fared far worse. Only California, where Republican governor Hiram Johnson was re-elected on the Progressive ticket, presented any success whatsoever. The party's national vote was cut in half without Roosevelt to lead its ticket.

World War I

In July 1914, war broke out in Europe. At the start, Americans remained aloof from the conflict, even as naval warfare interrupted transatlantic shipping. News of German atrocities in Belgium did elicit support for the Allied side but did not alter the general national stance of neutrality.

Within the Republican Party, views of the war were mixed:
 Anglophiles, especially Eastern elites like Roosevelt and Senator Elihu Root, vigorously backed the Preparedness Movement and called for unambiguous support for Britain.
 Isolationists, especially Midwesterners and Westerners like Senators Robert M. La Follette and Albert Cummins, saw the war as irrelevant or hazardous to American interests.
 Internationalists such as A. Lawrence Lowell and Taft joined President Wilson in favoring the establishment of American-led institutions for arbitration to end the war.

After the sinking of the RMS Lusitania in May 1915, American public opinion turned decisively in favor of the Allied forces. Wilson's tepid response, which did not mention the Lusitania by name or threaten any retaliatory action, enraged Republican interventionists. Nevertheless, the mood of the country was "overwhelming antiwar," and Wilson won praise for his efforts to avoid war through strength. Theodore Roosevelt privately believed that Wilson's re-election was guaranteed by his policy of "waging peace."

Theodore Roosevelt and Progressive reconciliation

Entering the 1916 election, Republicans were aware that the greatest threat to victory was the continued opposition of the Progressive Party, and in particular Theodore Roosevelt, who remained immensely popular. Although he still harbored antipathy for the Republican Party's political bosses, whom he believed had stolen his rightful nomination in 1912, both Roosevelt's personal enmity and the Progressive Party organization had weakened by 1914.

Upon Roosevelt's May 1914 return from his lengthy South American expedition, he affirmatively declined to speculate as to politics. He declined to run for Governor of New York that summer and instead endorsed moderate Harvey D. Hinman for the Republican nomination, in hopes that his Progressive Party would be able to cross-endorse the Republican nominee. Hinman lost the primary to Charles S. Whitman, but Progressives still endorsed Whitman for Governor.

After the Progressive defeats in 1914, Roosevelt became despondent and entered what he referred to as the "very nadir" of his life. He focused his writing in magazines, journals, and a twelve-chapter book, America and the World War, on criticizing the Wilson administration for neutrality. Much of his time was devoted to defending a libel suit brought by William Barnes Jr. In January 1916, Republicans and Progressives negotiated the possibility of fusion in the upcoming election. Roosevelt was floated as a Republican candidate in February, as he took more conservative stances on corporatism and wealth.

Procedure
After 1912, several more states adopted direct primary systems, which were expected to favor progressives, or informal advisory primaries. Nearly all of the Northern United States permitted a public vote on the presidential nomination, with Iowa, Indiana, Michigan, Minnesota, New Hampshire, Montana, West Virginia adopting the practice between 1912 and 1916.

Nevertheless, the entire South, most of the Rocky Mountain states, and Maine, Connecticut, Rhode Island, and Washington maintained the use of closed delegate conventions or caucuses, which tended to favor conservatives.

Candidates

Nominee

Withdrew during convention

Favorite sons
The following candidates entered only their home state's delegate selection contest for the purpose of controlling those delegates at the national convention:
Governor Martin G. Brumbaugh of Pennsylvania
Senator Lawrence Y. Sherman from Illinois
Industrialist and peace activist Henry Ford of Michigan

Declined
Senator William E. Borah of Idaho
Governor Hiram Johnson of California (Progressive)
Senator Henry Cabot Lodge of Massachusetts
Former President William Howard Taft of Ohio
Governor Charles S. Whitman of New York

Schedule and results

Campaign
Delegate selections began as early as March.

Early in the campaign, Theodore Roosevelt attempted to dampen widespread hopes that he would accept a joint Republican and Progressive nomination. On March 9, he issued a statement to the press insisting that his name "not be brought into the Massachusetts primaries" and "emphatically" declining to be a candidate. However, he declined to issue a Shermanesque statement and declared that his nomination would be a mistake "unless the country had in its mood something of the heroic." The New York Times reported the statement under the headline "ROOSEVELT'S HAT AGAIN IN THE RING."

While Roosevelt's support came largely from outside the Republican Party establishment, party loyalists attempted to recruit a candidate who would be acceptable to Progressives, or at least pacify Roosevelt. Their first choice was Charles Evans Hughes. Hughes, as Associate Justice of the Supreme Court, had the virtue of making few statements on political issues; even as an active politician, he had a character for reticence. He also had a reputation for progressivism as Governor of New York. When Roosevelt returned from the Caribbean in late March, he found two presidential booms underway: one for himself and one for Hughes. Roosevelt privately feared Hughes would merely be "Wilson with whiskers." However, Hughes was adamant that he was not a candidate; he had refused consideration in 1912 and had even stopped voting since joining the Court. "It seems to me very clear that, as a member of the Supreme Court, I h ave no right to be a candidate, either actively or passively," he wrote to New Jersey governor Edward C. Stokes.

On March 31, Roosevelt made his first overt move toward a return to the Republican Party by lunching with Elihu Root, who as president of the 1912 Republican National Convention had been the focus of Roosevelt's tirades for four years. With Wilson apparently vulnerable once more following Pancho Villa's attack on United States soil, Roosevelt appeared to be holding himself out for the nomination. However, Root himself had presidential ambitions as well.

Despite his denials, supporters entered Hughes's name in the April Nebraska primary. Hughes responded by threatening legal action to keep his name off the state ballot; nevertheless, the media and party supporters continued to trumpet Hughes as a candidate. He was finally persuaded by a letter from former President Taft, who argued that Hughes was the only man who could united the Progressives and Republicans and defeat Wilson. Taft wrote, "Your opportunity as President to guide the country through the trial bound to come after the war will be as great as Washington's or Lincoln's. You are equal to it. Strong men will respond to your call because you are yourself so satisfying in strength and in your political courage and patriotism." Sufficiently flattered, Hughes consulted with his colleagues Willis Van Devanter and Edward Douglass White; both urged him to accept if nominated.

Meanwhile, Roosevelt campaign committees and headquarters were soon established across the country. Roosevelt himself confided to Hiram Johnson that his true ambition was to "get the Republicans and Progressive together for someone whom we can elect and whom it will be worth electing." Privately, he believed that was Hughes, but held on to the ambition that he would be drafted by the delegates. Roosevelt's support faded after President Wilson took a stronger rhetorical stance against Germany.

May: Hughes in front
As the convention approached, Hughes began to receive intimations from Chief Justice White and Interior Secretary Franklin Lane that Wilson planned to appoint him as Chief Justice on White's retirement. Hughes responded that he would not allow the offer to affect his decision; he may have resolved to accept the nomination rather than be implicated in an apparent quid pro quo with Wilson. As the campaign came to a close, Hughes polled as the first choice of many Republican voters. He won the May primaries in Vermont (over Roosevelt) and Oregon (over Cummins) by wide margins. Frank Harris Hitchcock and Eugene Meyer, who managed the Hughes boom, found little trouble winning commitments from independent delegates to vote for Hughes.

Pre-convention maneuvering
On June 8, as the Republican and Progressive parties each convened in Chicago, leaders of the two met privately to discuss a compromise candidate. The Progressives made clear that the only acceptable name was Roosevelt; Republicans balked and resolved to risk a split by nominating Hughes or a more conservative man.

See also 
 1916 Democratic Party presidential primaries

Notes

References

Bibliography